Grae may refer to:

Given name
 Grae Fernandez (born 2001), Filipino actor
 Grae Kessinger (born 1997), American baseball player
 Grae Worster (born 1958), British physicist

Surname
 Camarin Grae, the pen name of Marian Grace (born 1941), American writer
 Jean Grae (born 1976), American rapper

See also
 GRAE, Revolutionary Government of Angola in Exile
 Græ, a 2020 album by Moses Sumney